Dendrobium moniliforme, known as Shihu in Chinese and Sekkoku in Japanese, is a species of orchid. It is native to Japan, Korea, China, the Himalayas, and northern Indochina.

Dendrobium moniliforme is the type species for the genus Dendrobium.

In 17th century Japan, royalty used it to perfume clothing.

References

External links 
  
 

moniliforme
Flora of East Himalaya
Flora of Indo-China
Orchids of China
Orchids of Japan
Orchids of Korea
Plants described in 1753
Taxa named by Carl Linnaeus